Monika Rinck (born 29 April 1969 in Zweibrücken) is a German writer.

Life and work
After graduating from high school, Monika Rinck studied religious studies, history, and comparative literature in Bochum, Berlin and Yale. She writes poetry, prose and essays, which she published in various publishing houses and numerous anthologies (including Der Große Conrady) and literary magazines (including BELLA triste, Edit, Poetenladen), and works as a translator. In addition, she wrote lyrics for the Italoberlin singer-songwriter Bruno Franceschini and the composers Franz Tröger and Bo Wiget. She is the sister of the sculptor Stefan Rinck.

In 2008, the ORF broadcast their work AM APPARAT (your truth style) in the series literature as radio art. From 2008 to 2016 she performed together with Ann Cotten and Sabine Scho as Rotten Kinck Schow. She taught u. a. at the German Literature Institute Leipzig and the University of Applied Arts in Vienna and curated POETICA III in Cologne in 2017. She is a member of the PEN Center Germany, the German Academy for Language and Poetry and the Berlin Academy of the Arts. From 1999 to 2017 she worked at rbb – Inforadio. In 2015 she gave the Munster Poetics Lecture, and in 2019 the Lichtenberg Poetics Lecture in Göttingen.

Works

Publications  
 Neues von der Phasenfront. Gegenstand: unproduktive Phasen, ein Theorie-Comic. b_books 1998, .
 Begriffsstudio [1996–2001]. Edition Sutstein 2001, .
 Verzückte Distanzen, Gedichte. Zu Klampen, Springe 2004, .
 fumbling with matches = Herumfingern an Gleichgesinnten. SuKuLTuR, Berlin 2005 (Reihe "Schöner Lesen", Nr. 38), .
 Ah, das Love-Ding, Essays. Kookbooks, Idstein 2006, .
 zum fernbleiben der umarmung, Gedichte. Kookbooks, Idstein 2007, .
 pass auf, pony! ein Hörbuch, Illustration: Petrus Akkordeon. Edition Sutstein 2008, .
 HELLE VERWIRRUNG / Rincks Ding- und Tierleben. Gedichte. Texte unter Zeichnungen. Kookbooks, Idstein 2009, .
 ELF KLEINE DRESSUREN. Max Marek (Scherenschnitt) und Monika Rinck (Texte). edition sutstein, Berlin 2009, .
 PARA-Riding. Laura (Riding) Jackson, Christian Filips und Monika Rinck (Gedichte, Essays, Übersetzungen). Roughbook 015, Berlin und Solothurn 2011.
 Helm aus Phlox. Zur Theorie des schlechtesten Werkzeugs. Mit Ann Cotten, Daniel Falb, Hendrik Jackson und Steffen Popp. Merve Verlag, Berlin 2011, .
 ICH BIN DER WIND. Geschwinde Lieder für Kinder. Mit Audio-CD. Illustriert von Andreas Töpfer. Mit Wilhelm Taubert (Lieder), Katia Tchemberdji (Komposition), Monika Rinck (Texte). Kookbooks Berlin 2011, .
 HONIGPROTOKOLLE. Sieben Skizzen zu Gedichten, welche sehr gut sind. Mit vier Liedern von Bo Wiget und einem Poster von Andreas Töpfer. Kookbooks, Berlin 2012, .
 HASENHASS. Eine Fibel in 47 Bildern. Verlag Peter Engstler, Ostheim/Rhön 2013, .
 Monika Rinck (= Poesiealbum 314), Lyrikauswahl von Klaus Siblewski, Grafik von Stefan Rinck. Märkischer Verlag Wilhelmshorst 2014, .
 I AM THE ZOO / Candy – Geschichten vom inneren Biest. Mit Nele Brönner (Illustrationen). Verlag Peter Engstler, Ostheim/Rhön 2014, .
 RISIKO UND IDIOTIE. Streitschriften. Kookbooks, Berlin 2015, .
 LIEDER FÜR DIE LETZTE RUNDE. Ein Hörbuch. Text: Monika Rinck. Komposition: Franz Tröger. Gesang: Christian Filips. Kookbooks, Berlin 2015, 
 Wir. Essay. Verlagshaus Berlin 2015, .
 DIE VERLORENE WELT / THE LOST WORLD. Im Rahmen des Modellprojektes Kunst/Natur. Künstlerische Interventionen im Museum für Naturkunde Berlin. Erscheint zur Ausstellung 25. April to 23 July 2017. Englische Übersetzung: Nicholas Grindell. Berlin, 2017, .
 Kritik der Motorkraft. Brüterich Press Berlin 2017, 
 Champagner für die Pferde. Ein Lesebuch. S. Fischer Verlag 2019, 
 Alle Türen. Gedichte. kookbooks Berlin 2019, 
 Wirksame Fiktionen. Lichtenberg-Poetikvorlesung. Wallstein Göttingen 2019, 
 Heida! Heida! He! Sadismus von irgend etwas Modernem und ich und Lärm! Fernando Pessoas sensationistischer Ingenieur Álvaro de Campos. Verlag Das Wunderhorn 2019,

Translations 
 István Kemény: Nützliche Ruinen, Gedichte. Aus dem Ungarischen von Orsolya Kalász, Monika Rinck, Gerhard Falkner, Steffen Popp. Gutleut Verlag 2007, .
 János Térey: KaltWasserKult, Gedichte. Aus dem Ungarischen von Orsolya Kalász, Monika Rinck, Gerhard Falkner. Akademie Schloss Solitude, 2007, .
 Bálint Harcos: Naive Pflanze, Erzählung. Aus dem Ungarischen von Orsolya Kalász und Monika Rinck. Akademie Schloss Solitude, 2008, .
 István László G.: Sandfuge, Gedichte. Aus dem Ungarischen von Orsolya Kalász und Monika Rinck. Akademie Schloss Solitude, 2009, .
 Tomaž Šalamun: Rudert! Rudert! Gedichte. Aus dem Slowenischen von Gregor Podlogar und Monika Rinck. Edition Korrespondenzen, 2012, .
 András Gerevich: Teiresias' Geständnisse, Gedichte. Aus dem Ungarischen von Orsolya Kalász, Timea Tankó und Monika Rinck. Akademie Schloss Solitude, 2013, .
 Kinga Tóth: Allmaschine, Gedichte. Aus dem Ungarischen von Orsolya Kalász und Monika Rinck. Ungarisch, Deutsch. Edition Solitude, 2014, .
 István Kemény: ein guter traum mit tieren, Gedichte. Aus dem Ungarischen von Orsolya Kalász und Monika Rinck. Ungarisch, Deutsch. Matthes & Seitz, 2015, .
 Márió Z. Nemes: Puschkins Brüste, Gedichte. Aus dem Ungarischen von Orsolya Kalász, Monika Rinck und Matthias Kniep. Ungarisch, Deutsch. Edition Solitude, 2016, 
 Magnus William-Olsson: Homullus absconditus, Gedichte. [HYPNO-HOMULLUS] Unter Hypnose aus dem Schwedischen ins Deutsche übersetzt und herausgegeben von Monika Rinck. (= roughbooks; 039). Urs Engeler, Solothurn 2016, .
 Eugene Ostashevsky: Der Pirat, der von Pi den Wert nicht kennt, Gedichte. Aus dem amerikanischen Englisch von Monika Rinck und Uljana Wolf. kookbooks 2017, .
 István Kemény: Ich übergebe das Zeitalter, Gedichte. Aus dem Ungarischen von Orsolya Kalász und Monika Rinck. Reinecke & Voß, 2019, .

References

German women writers
1969 births
Living people